雲城 may refer to:

 Wan Shing (constituency), Tai Wai, Sha Tin, New Territories, Hong Kong
 Yuncheng District, Yunfu, Guangdong, China

 Yuncheng Subdistrict, Baiyun District, Guangzhou, Guangdong, China

 Unsong Village, Hwangju County, North Hwanghae Province, North Korea

See also

 
 
 
 Yuncheng (disambiguation), several Mandarin Chinese topics
 Unsong (disambiguation), several Korean topics